The Everglades Laundry is a historic site at 105 West Broadway in Everglades City, Florida.

On September 22, 2001, the site was added to the U.S. National Register of Historic Places.

The wayside marker describes it as the Old Laundry Building, and it was completed in 1928, serving in the capacity as a community laundry building. It became the clubhouse for the "Everglades Women's Club" in 1965, when it was purchased from the Colliers.

Museum of the Everglades
The site is now the home of the  Museum of the Everglades, opened in 1998 by the Collier County Museum.   Exhibits display the history and culture of the southwest Everglades area, including the ancient Calusa, Seminole, pioneers and entrepreneurs, such as Barron Collier.

References and external links
 Collier County listings at National Register of Historic Places
 Florida's Office of Cultural and Historical Programs
 Collier County markers
 Museum of the Everglades
 Old Laundry Building Waymark

External links

 web site of the Everglades Museum
 Everglades City Museum - Collier County information
 Everglades City Museum - Explore Naples information

Museums in Collier County, Florida
National Register of Historic Places in Collier County, Florida
History museums in Florida
Women's clubs in Florida
Former laundry buildings
Buildings and structures completed in 1928
1928 establishments in Florida